Angeliki Koutsonikoli (2 June 1989 – 5 July 2012) was a Greek female track cyclist. She competed at the 2010 and 2011 UCI Track Cycling World Championships.

References

External links
 Profile at cyclingarchives.com

1989 births
2012 deaths
Greek track cyclists
Greek female cyclists
Place of birth missing